Jamahl is a given name. Notable people with the name include:

Jamahl Knowles (born 1988), Canadian football player
Jamahl Lolesi (born 1981), New Zealand rugby league footballer
Jamahl Mosley (born 1978), American basketball coach and former player

See also
Jamal